The People's Resistance – Left Anti-imperialist Cooperation (Laiki Antistasi – Aristeri Antiimperialistiki Synergasia, L.A. – A.A.S.) was a coalition of Marxist-Leninist and anti-revisionist left political organisations in Greece. Communist Party of Greece (Marxist–Leninist) and Marxist–Leninist Communist Party of Greece were members of this cooperation. People's Resistance was founded in 2013 and dissolved in 2020.

External links

2013 establishments in Greece
2020 disestablishments in Greece
Anti-capitalist organizations
Defunct communist parties in Greece
Defunct left-wing political party alliances
Defunct political party alliances in Greece
Eurosceptic parties in Greece
Far-left politics in Greece
Political parties disestablished in 2020
Political parties established in 2013
Greece